Khankaysky District is an administrative and municipal district (raion), one of the twenty-two in Primorsky Krai, Russia. It is located in the west of the krai on the western bank of Lake Khanka and borders with Pogranichny District in the southwest, Khorolsky District in the southeast, and with Heilongjiang Province of China in the west. Its administrative center is the rural locality (a selo) of Kamen-Rybolov. Population:  The population of Kamen-Rybolov accounts for 44.2% of the district's total population.

Economy
Khankaysky District is one of the largest agricultural regions of the krai. The area of agricultural grounds totals . Soybeans, rice, buckwheat, and vegetables are cultivated. Meat, milk, and honey are also produced in the district. Fish breeding is cultivated in ponds.

Another feature of this district is a customs point, Tury Rog, which is located on the Russian-Chinese border. Heavy track traffic passes through this point. Close to the customs point is a large Chinese coal mining basin, Jixi.

There are no large industrial enterprises in this area, which helps keep the recreational zones ecologically clean.

References

Notes

Sources

Districts of Primorsky Krai
